"2000 Miles" is a song by British-American rock band Pretenders. Written by lead singer Chrissie Hynde and produced by Chris Thomas, it was released on 18 November 1983 as the second single from their third studio album, Learning to Crawl (1984). It was most popular in the UK, where it peaked at No. 15 on the UK Singles Chart in December 1983. In the US, it was released as the B-side of both the 7-inch single and 12-inch single remix of the band's hit "Middle of the Road".

Considered a Christmas song, it has been released on various Christmas compilation albums.

Background
The song is about two long-distance lovers who miss each other at Christmastime. "Robbie McIntosh plays beautifully on '2000 Miles'," Hynde recalled. "Anything to avoid listening to my voice and my stupid words."

The song frequently reappears in the UK Charts around Christmas time staying in the charts for a few weeks over the Christmas period. Similarly, in Poland the song plays everyday in December as part of the Christmas rotation on RMF FM's RMF Classic.

Critical reception
Dave Marsh, in his 1989 book The Heart of Rock & Soul: The 1001 Greatest Singles Ever Made, ranked "2000 Miles"' as the 630th best rock or soul single to that date. It is one of four songs by Pretenders listed in the book.  Ultimate Classic Rock critic Matt Wardlaw rated it the Pretenders 9th greatest song, calling it "one of the season's most beloved Christmas songs."

Music video
The official video features Hynde dressed as a member of The Salvation Army in a snowy location. Chrissie Hynde also recorded a version of the song in 1995 with violins and other stringed instruments.

Covers
British rock band Coldplay released a piano cover of the song as a charity single. The track's digital download was available for £1.50 between 16 December 2003 and 1 January 2004, with all royalties being donated to Stop Handgun Violence and Future Forests.

Charts

Certifications

References

1983 singles
American Christmas songs
The Pretenders songs
Song recordings produced by Chris Thomas (record producer)
Sire Records singles
Songs written by Chrissie Hynde
1983 songs
Songs about musicians
British soft rock songs
Music videos directed by Tim Pope